English singer-songwriter Adele has released four studio albums, one video album, two extended plays, 17 singles and eleven music videos. Adele has sold over 70 million in pure album sales and over 100 million in album equivalent units worldwide over four studio albums and one video album as of December 2021. She was named the best-selling album artist of the 2010s decade in the US and worldwide. She has also sold over 100 million in single sales with total sales records over 170 million as of December 2021. She also became the best-selling female artist of the 21st century in the UK. Her album 21 became the best selling album of 2010s decade and best selling album of 21st century. 30 also became the best selling album of 2020s decade so far.

Adele signed a record deal with XL in 2006, and released her debut album 19 in 2008 which sold over 8 million in pure album sales worldwide as of 2022. The album reached number one on the UK Albums Chart, and her single, "Chasing Pavements", reached number two on the UK Singles Chart. Another single, "Make You Feel My Love", reached number one in the Netherlands.

21, Adele's second studio album, was released on 24 January 2011. The album was immediately certified platinum by the British Phonographic Industry while debuting at number one. 21 spent 24 weeks atop the Billboard 200 since its US release and has sold over 31 million in pure album sales worldwide to become the best selling album of 21st century. The album's first single, "Rolling in the Deep", also reached number two in the UK and became her first number one on the US Billboard Hot 100. The second single, "Someone like You", was released in February 2011 and peaked at number one in the UK and Ireland, her first in her home country. It also became her second number one in the US. "Set Fire to the Rain" was released as the third single off the album in the rest of Europe and became her third number one in the US. In 2012, it was confirmed Adele would record and release the new James Bond theme. In October that same year, she released "Skyfall", which peaked at number two in the UK and number eight in the US, as well as reaching the top position in Germany, France, Ireland, the Netherlands and Switzerland. She also won the Academy Award for Best Original Song for "Skyfall".

25, Adele's third studio album, was released on 20 November 2015. It became the best-selling album of 2015 with 17.4 million copies sold within the year and sold over 23 million in pure album sales worldwide as of 2022. "Hello" was released as the lead single from the album on 23 October 2015 and peaked atop the charts in United Kingdom, where it became her second UK number-one single. In the United States the song debuted at number one on the Billboard Hot 100, becoming Adele's fourth number-one single in the US and breaking several records, including becoming the first song with over a million digital sales in a week. As of March 2016, Adele had sold over 10 million albums in the UK; meanwhile, in the US, the singer has sold 31 million albums as of January 2022.

30, Adele's fourth studio album, was released on 19 November 2021. It was an international success, topping the official charts in 34 countries. It became the best-selling album worldwide for 2021 with 5.5 million copies sold within the year. It became the best-selling album of the 2020s decade in the world and in the UK. It also became the best-selling album of 2021 and 2022 in the US. "Easy on Me" was released as the lead single on 15 October 2021 to international success, peaking atop charts in over 25 countries, including the UK Official Singles Chart and the US Billboard Hot 100. It became Adele's longest running number one single in the UK, topping the chart for 8 weeks. In addition, after 30 release, Adele's total weeks at number one rose to 42 weeks at number one on the UK Official Albums Chart, more than any other female singer. After 30 spent six consecutive weeks at number one on the Billboard 200, Adele became the British soloist with the most weeks at number one in chart's history with 40 weeks.

Albums

Studio albums

Video albums

Extended plays

Singles

As lead artist

As featured artist

Other charted and certified songs

Music videos

See also
List of best-selling music artists
List of best-selling female music artists in the United Kingdom
List of Billboard Hot 100 chart achievements and milestones
List of artists who have achieved simultaneous UK and US number-one hits
List of artists who have achieved simultaneous number-one single and album in the United States
List of artists who reached number one on the UK Singles Chart
List of artists who reached number one on the U.S. Dance Club Songs chart
List of artists who reached number one in the United States

Notes

References

Discography
Discographies of British artists
Pop music discographies
Soul music discographies